Autumn Song is the fifth album released by blues/jazz pianist and vocalist Mose Allison which was recorded in 1959 and released on the Prestige label.

Reception

Scott Yanow of Allmusic states, "One realizes why Allison was soon emphasizing his vocals; he was a much more distinctive singer than pianist although his piano playing was actually pretty inventive. This is an excellent all-round set". The Penguin Guide to Jazz wrote that the album was "nicely balanced between vocal set-pieces [...] and his serious stuff".

Track listing 
All compositions by Mose Allison except where noted.
 "Promenade" – 4:09     
 "Eyesight to the Blind" (Sonny Boy Williamson II) – 1:41     
 "It's Crazy" (Dorothy Fields, Richard Rodgers) – 3:37     
 "That's All Right", (Jimmy Rogers) – 2:27     
 "Devil in the Cane Field" – 4:02     
 "Strange" (Matthew Fisher, John La Touche) – 3:06     
 "Autumn Song" – 3:40     
 "Do Nothin' Till You Hear from Me" (Duke Ellington, Bob Russell) – 3:11     
 "Spires" – 3:03     
 "Groovin' High" (Dizzy Gillespie) – 5:39

Personnel 
Mose Allison – piano, vocals
Addison Farmer – bass
Ronnie Free – drums

References 

Mose Allison albums
1959 albums
Prestige Records albums
Albums produced by Bob Weinstock
Albums recorded at Van Gelder Studio